Events in the year 2019 in Denmark.

Incumbents
 Monarch – Margrethe II
 Prime Minister – Lars Løkke Rasmussen

Events
 2 January – Great Belt Bridge rail accident: A DSB express passenger train is hit by a semi-trailer from a passing cargo train on the western bridge of the Great Belt Fixed Link in Denmark, killing eight people and making it the deadliest rail accident in the country since 1988.
 10–27 January – 2019 World Men's Handball Championship – co-hosted with Germany
 26 May – The 2019 European Parliament election
 5 June – 2019 Danish general election
 27 June – The Cabinet of Mette Frederiksen is presented.
 16 August –; The government of Denmark rejects the suggestion that the United States might purchase Greenland.

The arts

Film

Music

Sport

Badminton
 17 February – Denmark wins the 2019 European Mixed Team Badminton Championships by defeating Germany 3–0 in the final.
 24–31 March – Viktor Axelsen wins Men's Single at 2019 India Open.
 25 August  Anders Antonsen wins silver in men's single at the 2019 BWF World Championships.
 15 2019 Denmark Open takes place in Odense.

Cycling
 27 February – 3 March – Denmark wins one silver medal and two bronze medals at the 2019 UCI Track Cycling World Championships
 39 April – Jakob Fuglsang wins 2019 Liège–Bastogne–Liège.
 16 June – Jakob Fuglsang wins the Critérium du Dauphiné.
 29 September – Mads Pedersen wins gold in Men's road race at the 2019 UCI Road World Championships.
 16–20 October – 2019 UEC European Track Championships
 17 October — Denmark wins gold in Team Pursuit at the 2019 UEC European Track Championships.
 17 October – Denmark wins a gold medal in Team Pursuit.
 20 October
  Amalie Dideriksen and Julie Leth wins a gold medal for Denmark in Women's Madison.
 Lasse Norman Hansen and Michael Mørkøv wins a gold medal for Denmark in Men's madison.

Golf
 8 December – Rasmus Højgaard wins AfrAsia Bank Mauritius Openn.

Handball
 27 January – Denmark wins the 2019 World Men's Handball Championship in handball by defeating Norway 31–27 in the final.

Sailing
 30 Oc tober – Anne-Marie Rindom wins the 2019 Women's World Sailor of the Year Award.

Tennis
 8 June – Holger Vitus Nødskov Rune wins the 2019 French Open – Boys' Singles.

Deaths
5 May - Ib Glindemann, jazz composer and bandleader (born 1934)
 10 June – Ib Nørlund, composer (born 1931)

See also

 2019 European Parliament election
 2019 in Danish music

References

Links
 

 
Years of the 21st century in Denmark
Denmark
Denmark
2010s in Denmark